The 2020 ITTF Challenge Series is the fourth season of the International Table Tennis Federation's secondary professional table tennis tour, a level below the ITTF World Tour. As in the previous season, the ITTF Challenge Series is split into two tiers: Challenge Plus and Challenge.

Schedule

ITTF Challenge Series is divided into two tiers: Challenge Plus and Challenge.

Below is the 2020 schedule announced by the International Table Tennis Federation:

Key

Winners
Key

See also
2020 World Table Tennis Championships
2020 ITTF World Tour

References

External links
International Table Tennis Federation
2020 ITTF Challenge Series

 
ITTF Challenge Series
Challenge Series